The Drama Desk Award for Outstanding Director of a Play is an annual award presented by Drama Desk in recognition of achievements in the theatre among Broadway, Off Broadway and Off-Off Broadway productions. The awards were established in 1955, with the Drama Desk Award for Outstanding Director being presented to directors of both plays and musicals. The new award categories were later created in the 1975 ceremony.

Winners and nominees

1970s

1980s

1990s

2000s

2010s

2020s

See also
 Laurence Olivier Award for Best Director
 Tony Award for Best Direction of a Play

References

External links
 Drama Desk official website

Play Director